Rostanga alisae is a species of sea slug, a dorid nudibranch, a marine gastropod mollusc in the family Discodorididae.

Distribution
This species was described from Peter the Great Bay, Japan Sea, Russia.

Description

Ecology
This nudibranch is found from the intertidal zone to 15 m depth, feeding on the red sponge Ophlitaspongia pennata'' in the family Microcionidae.

References

Discodorididae
Gastropods described in 2003